Temple Grandin is a 2010 American biographical drama television film directed by Mick Jackson and starring Claire Danes as Temple Grandin, a woman with autism  whose innovations revolutionized practices for the humane handling of livestock on cattle ranches and slaughterhouses. It is based on Grandin's memoirs Emergence and Thinking in Pictures. The film premiered on HBO on February 6, 2010, and won several awards including five Primetime Emmy Awards, and Golden Globe and Screen Actors Guild prizes for Danes.

Plot
Temple Grandin is an uncommunicative child who is prone to tantrums and is diagnosed with autism. The medical consensus at that time was that autism was a form of schizophrenia resulting from insufficient maternal affection. Despite recommendations to place her in an institution, Grandin's mother hires therapists and works to help her daughter adapt to social interaction.

As a teenager, Temple travels to her aunt and uncle's ranch to work. She observes cows being placed into a squeeze chute to calm them, and, during an anxiety attack, she uses the chute to calm herself.  Inspired by her teacher, Dr. Carlock, to pursue science, she is admitted to Franklin Pierce College where she develops an early version of the squeeze machine to calm herself during stressful times. Her college misinterprets the use of the machine as a sexual act and forces her to remove it. In response, she develops a scientific protocol to test subjects' reactions to the machine, proving it to be a purely therapeutic device. Grandin graduates with a degree in psychology and pursues a master's degree in animal science.

Temple faces sexism while attempting to integrate into the world of cattle ranching but ultimately designs a new dip structure designed to allow cattle to voluntarily move through rather than being forced. Initially, the device works as intended, and garners favorable coverage in local press, but the ranch hands are dismissive of her design and alter it, resulting in the drowning of several cows. Angered, Grandin visits Carlock, and leaves the meeting encouraged to continue her efforts to improve the industry.

Temple and her mother attend the 1981 National Autistic Convention. The speaker is unable to answer many of the questions from the audience, but Temple speaks out from the crowd explaining how she has adapted, and tells of her mother's contributions to her success. The audience calls her to the podium, marking Temple's transition into autism advocacy.

Cast
 Claire Danes as Temple Grandin
 Catherine O'Hara as Aunt Ann, Temple's aunt and sister in-law of Eustacia. As a teenager, Temple often visited her Arizona cattle ranch during the summer.
 Julia Ormond as Eustacia Cutler, Temple's mother. When Temple was younger, Eustacia was in denial over the doctor's diagnosis of Temple's autism. Eustacia was determined to have her daughter receive an education and lead a normal life.
 David Strathairn as Dr. Carlock, Temple's boarding school science teacher and mentor. Carlock was aware of Temple's visual skills and was supportive in furthering her education.
 Charles Baker as Billy, a worker at Aunt Ann's farm.
 Barry Tubb as Randy

Production

Development
The idea for a biopic of Grandin originated with its executive producer Emily Gerson Saines, a successful talent agent and a co-founder of the nonprofit Autism Coalition for Research and Education (now part of Autism Speaks). In the mid-1990s, Gerson Saines was a vice-president at the William Morris Agency when her 2-year-old son was diagnosed with autism. She learned about Grandin soon afterward, when her mother told her about seeing Grandin's book Thinking in Pictures in a bookstore and, around the same time, her grandmother independently sent her an article about Grandin by Oliver Sacks.

Reading about Grandin renewed Gerson Saines' "energy, motivation and spirit" in coping with her son's condition. "Temple's story brought me hope and (her mother)'s story gave me direction and purpose," Gerson Saines said in a later interview. "Parents of a child with autism everywhere need to hear it, functionally and spiritually. I knew this story had to be told and given my access as a talent representative in the entertainment industry, I felt it was my responsibility to make that happen." Through Grandin's agent, Gerson Saines asked to meet Grandin for lunch. "She came in wearing her cowgirl shirt—in her very Temple way, in her very Temple walk. I realized that there were people staring at her, and in a different lifetime I might have been one of them, but all I could think of was, 'I can't believe how lucky I am to be here. This woman's my hero.

Grandin was familiar with Gerson Saines' work with the Autism Coalition and granted her permission to make the film, but the endeavor—first launched in the late 1990s—would take more than ten years to come to fruition. Variety reported in 2002 that David O. Russell was attached to direct the film from a screenplay by W. Merritt Johnson (adapting from Grandin's memoirs Emergence and Thinking in Pictures). Russell later dropped out and was replaced by Moisés Kaufman, who also left the project. By 2008, Mick Jackson had signed on to direct, and Claire Danes was in negotiations to star as Grandin. Johnson's script had been replaced by one from Christopher Monger (both Johnson and Monger are credited as writers of the finished film).

One element Gerson Saines was sure about from the beginning was that she wanted to work with HBO, in part because of her longstanding relationship with the network through her work as an agent. "But I also knew that by going that route, more people will see it," she said. "When you're trying to make a movie like this, it's very rare that it reaches a wide audience." HBO was equally intrigued by the story, and Gerson Saines credits past and present HBO executives with keeping the project alive until it could be properly realized. "I made a commitment to Temple that I was going to make it and make it right...I never pushed to get it made until now, because now we got it right."

Jackson knew early on that Danes was his first choice to portray Grandin, believing that Danes' seriousness and dedication would help her to capture Grandin's mercurial mental and emotional shifts without veering the film into disease-of-the-week melodrama. Danes herself was coming off a string of more lightweight roles (whose "primary job and experience [was] to become gaga over a man," she described) and eager to take on a more demanding part. Although she was only vaguely aware of Grandin at the time, Danes dove into research, including watching documentaries about Grandin and studying Grandin's books and recordings. "It was really daunting, because she's alive and has a great eye for detail," Danes said. The two women spent about six hours together in Danes' apartment, ending with a hug from Grandin ("For her, that's not easy," Danes observed), which Danes was glad to take as validation that Grandin approved of her for the role.

Filming
Temple Grandin began shooting in October 2008 at Austin Studios in Austin, Texas. The film was noted for filming in Texas at a time when TV and film production had grown scarce in the state, and legislators were seeking to expand financial incentives to draw more film crews. Grandin producer Scott Ferguson said that Arizona, New Mexico and Canada had all been considered before producers had chosen Texas, in part because different areas of the state could be used to represent the rural West and New England. Ferguson also credited the abundance of trained film crews in the Austin and Dallas regions as a significant benefit to shooting in the area. Cinematographer Ivan Strasburg shot the film on Kodak Super 16 mm film stocks with Arriflex 416 cameras, which were usually operated hand-held to "create a 'slight' feeling of visual tension."

Gerson Saines brought Grandin to observe the last day of shooting, which was a scene involving a cattle dip tank that Grandin had designed. Although Grandin said that she tried to stay away from Danes to avoid impinging on her performance, she was quite concerned about the proper construction of the tank and about the breed of cattle being used in the scene. "I thought, we can't have a silly thing like that City Slickers movie, where they had Holstein cattle out there," Grandin said. "If you know anything about cattle, you'd know that was stupid." She said watching Danes on the monitors was "like going back in a weird time machine to the '60s."

Release

Promotion
The film was previewed on January 27 at the Gene Siskel Film Center, in a screening attended by Grandin. A trailer was previewed for critics during their winter press tour on January 14; critics responded positively to "the film's bright palette and inventive direction."

HBO and bookstore chain Barnes & Noble partnered to promote both the film and Grandin's books, displaying information about autism and the film in all Barnes & Noble stores and creating a free downloadable coloring book about Grandin, using illustrations by autistic artists. Grandin appeared for a special book signing, discussion and preview of the film at a Manhattan Barnes & Noble on January 25.

Reception

Upon its February 6, 2010 debut, Temple Grandin received a Metacritic score of 84/100 based on reviews from 19 critics. Review aggregator Rotten Tomatoes gives the film a 100% approval rating based on six reviews.

Entertainment Weeklys Jennifer Armstrong wrote: 

Alessandra Stanley of The New York Times called it: 

Robert Bianco of USA Today wrote that unlike many other HBO productions, "Temple is an incredibly joyous and often humorous film." While praising the direction and the strong supporting cast of Catherine O'Hara, David Strathairn, and Julia Ormond, Bianco declared that "as good as everything is around them, Temple Grandin belongs to two women: the real Temple, who appears to be a spectacular human being, and Danes, who is clearly a spectacular actor."

The A.V. Clubs Noel Murray, himself the father of an autistic son, wrote:  Murray gives the film a grade A−, in part for Danes' success in portraying Grandin as a full-fledged personality instead of "a checklist of symptoms gleaned from a medical journal."

NPR's David Bianculli unambiguously named the film:

Accolades

Notes

References

External links
 Temple Grandin at HBO
 
 

2010 films
2010 biographical drama films
2010s American films
2010s English-language films
American biographical drama films
American drama television films
Biographical films about scientists
Biographical television films
Films about autism
Films about cattle
Films based on memoirs
Films based on multiple works
Films directed by Mick Jackson
Films scored by Alex Wurman
Films set in the 1950s
Films set in the 1960s
Films set in the 1970s
Films set in the 1980s
Films set in Arizona
Films set in Boston
Films set in New Hampshire
Films shot in Austin, Texas
Films shot in Dallas
Films shot in New Braunfels, Texas
HBO Films films
Peabody Award-winning broadcasts
Primetime Emmy Award for Outstanding Made for Television Movie winners
Television films based on books
Films about disability